The Volkswagen Golf (Mk8) (also known as the Golf VIII) is a compact car, the eighth generation of the Volkswagen Golf and the successor to the Volkswagen Golf Mk7. It was launched in Wolfsburg on 24 October 2019, and arrived in German showrooms in December 2019.

The Golf Mk8 uses the same revised MQB platform as the fourth-generation Audi A3 and SEAT León.

Features 
The exterior of the Mk8 has evolutionary design changes, with a new two-dimensional Volkswagen logo and more angular styling. At the rear there are new L-shaped taillights similar to those of the T-Roc. A more prominent downward arch at the nose contributes to a reduced drag coefficient; the Mk8's is  compared to the Mk7's , giving a drag area of 0.61 m2. The dimensions are roughly the same as the Mk7, 29 mm longer, and 10 mm narrower with a similar wheelbase. The three-door hatchback has been discontinued, leaving the five-door hatchback as the only model available at launch. The Golf Estate (Variant) was revealed in September 2020, alongside a rugged "Alltrack" version with slightly raised suspension, body cladding, and all-wheel-drive.

Technology 
The Mk8 features several technological advancements, including standard LED headlights on all models and optional matrix LEDs, an advanced head-up display, a shift by wire system on models with the dual-clutch gearbox, Alexa integration, and an NFC mobile key with compatible Samsung smartphones via eSIM. The interior receives a major overhaul, replacing the traditional analog instrument panel with an entirely digital 10.25" driver's display and either an 8.25" or 10" centre touchscreen for multimedia. Instead of physical buttons, a touch-sensitive panel houses controls for various functions, including the headlights and air conditioning/ventilation. The vehicle can also be upgraded with new functions after purchasing it, such as adaptive cruise control, WiFi hotspot, online-based voice control, Light Assist, navigation and Wireless App-Connect. The reliance on touchscreen controls in place of conventional physical buttons, knobs, or dials was criticised as being frustrating and unintuitive to use. Which? noted that "too much attention must be diverted from the road to operate simple functions such as the climate control" and called the layout "a step backwards."

Assistance systems 

Using the adaptive cruise control and lane-keeping assist systems, the steering wheel has sensors that detect when the driver is touching it; if no input is detected for more than 15 seconds, the emergency braking system will automatically activate. Adaptive Cruise Control now uses predictive speed detection which automatically adjusts the speed by calculating the car's position based on route and GPS data; it simultaneously accesses the Dynamic Road Sign Display via the front camera.

Golf GTE 
The Golf GTE is a high-performance plug-in hybrid model. The GTE, GTD, and GTI have different styling to distinguish them from less powerful Golf models. The front has a large honeycomb grille with a blue accent and an LED light strip positioned below, a black lower bumper trim, and an integrated background exterior light. The rear has a diffuser-style rear bumper. The roof spoiler is also different, with wider side sill panels, larger wheels, and red brake calipers. Inside, there are many minor differences, including sports seats with different interior fabrics and other minor changes.

Golf GTD 
The Golf GTD is a high-performance turbodiesel model. The engine uses two selective catalytic reduction filters with dual AdBlue injection. The manual transmission is not offered, with the seven-speed dual-clutch automatic being the only option. The suspension is shared with the GTI, having MacPherson struts up front and a multi-link system at the rear. 18-inch and 19-inch wheels are available. Plaid upholstery is standard like on the GTI, but grey highlights are used rather than red; the steering wheel also has touch-sensitive multi-function controls. An electronic shift lever is used in place of the patterned shift knob found on the GTI.

Golf GTI 
The Golf GTI is a high-performance petrol (gasoline) model. The bodywork is nearly identical to the GTE, however the GTI is equipped with different wheels, badges, and red grille accents. The rear bumper has dual exit exhausts. Vehicle Dynamics Manager allows for more adjustability of the adaptive suspension dampers, while an Individual setting joins the other driving modes. Inside, plaid upholstery is standard, with additional red accents on the seats and steering wheel. 17-inch wheels are standard in Europe, with optional 18-inch and 19-inch wheels.

Golf R 
It is offered with either the seven-speed dual-clutch automatic globally or the six-speed manual (US and Canadian markets only) in both the hatch and estate body styles. The R is  lower than the standard Golf, and has a stiffer suspension incorporating an aluminium front subframe. The all-wheel-drive system has been updated and benefits from a torque-vectoring rear differential. Dynamic Chassis Control has also been updated to work with the Vehicle Dynamics Manager, allowing for a Drift Mode function. The exterior features quad exhaust tips and 19-inch wheels, while the interior is similar to the GTI, and has Nappa leather bucket seats as well as several R badges and an R-specific driver's display.

Powertrain 
All internal combustion engines are turbocharged three- or four-cylinder units; engine options include petrol, mild-hybrid, plug-in hybrid, diesel and natural gas powertrains. The previous e-Golf model is no longer available, as it was replaced by the ID.3.

TSI

Euro 6d

All engines with an output up to 130 PS feature the efficient TSI Miller combustion process and a variable-geometry turbocharger, and the 1.5 litre engines have temporary Active Cylinder Management. A compressed natural gas (CNG) version of the 1.5 litre engine is also available as a TGI model.

Euro 5

Unlike previous Golf's which featured a 7-speed dual clutch gearbox (DSG), this engine will be paired with a traditional 8-speed torque converter automatic. The transmission choice is due in part to the specific engine calibration (and automatic transmission combination) developed to meet Australia's outdated Euro 5 emissions regulations introduced in 2009, which are about a decade behind European standards.

eTSI
eTSI models use the same engines as the TSI models with the addition of a mild-hybrid system and a powerful brake energy recuperation function, paired exclusively with the 7-speed dual clutch gearbox (DSG). The energy stored in the 48 V lithium-ion battery supplies the 12 V vehicle electrical system and drives the 48 V belt starter generator.

eHybrid
eHybrid models use a 1.4 litre turbocharged plug-in hybrid engine supplanted by a 13 kWh lithium ion battery, with a 6-speed DSG.

TDI
TDI models utilise a new twin dosing system featuring dual AdBlue selective catalytic reduction, which lowers nitrogen oxide emissions (NOx) by up to 80% compared to the Mk7.

Safety

Euro NCAP
The Golf in its standard European configuration received 5 stars from Euro NCAP in 2019.

IIHS

Golf GTI
The 2022 Golf GTI was tested by the IIHS and received a Top Safety Pick award:

Golf R
The 2022 Golf R was tested by the IIHS and received a Top Safety Pick+ award:

References

External links 

 Official website (United Kingdom)

Compact cars
Station wagons
Front-wheel-drive vehicles
All-wheel-drive vehicles
Euro NCAP small family cars
Golf_Mk8
2010s cars
2020s cars
Hybrid electric cars
Plug-in hybrid vehicles
Hot hatches
Cars introduced in 2019